The Europe Zone was one of the two regional zones of the 1926 International Lawn Tennis Challenge.

19 teams entered the Europe Zone, with the winner going on to compete in the Inter-Zonal Final against the winner of the America Zone. France defeated Great Britain in the final, and went on to face Japan in the Inter-Zonal Final.

Draw

First round

Romania vs. Italy

Netherlands vs. Belgium

South Africa vs. Portugal

Second round

Ireland vs. Spain

Argentina vs. Hungary

Great Britain vs. Poland

Italy vs. Netherlands

Sweden vs. Switzerland

Czechoslovakia vs. India

Denmark vs. France

Quarterfinals

Spain vs. Argentina

Italy vs. Great Britain

Sweden vs. South Africa

Czechoslovakia vs. France

Semifinals

Spain vs. Great Britain

Sweden vs. France

Final

France vs. Great Britain

References

External links
Davis Cup official website

Davis Cup Europe/Africa Zone
Europe Zone
International Lawn Tennis Challenge